Immaculate Conception Catholic School is a diocesan, Catholic school in the heart of Umingan, Pangasinan that offers pre-school, grade school, high school and college preparatory courses under the Roman Catholic Diocese of Urdaneta in the Philippines.

References 

Educational institutions established in 1948
1948 establishments in the Philippines
De La Salle Supervised Schools
Schools in Pangasinan